Yang Se-jong (born December 23, 1992) is a South Korean actor and model. Yang became well known when he starred as a young chef in the 2017 romance drama Temperature of Love which won him three Best New Actor awards at the SBS Drama Awards, Baeksang Arts Awards, and the 6th APAN Star Awards. His other works included Dr. Romantic (2016), Duel (2017), Still 17 (2018), and My Country: The New Age (2019).

Early life and education 
Yang was born on December 23, 1992 in Anyang, Gyeonggi. In his first two years of high school, Yang worked at a book and DVD rental store as a part-time job. While in his second year of high school, Yang began to dream of becoming an actor after watching school plays with his friends. Before choosing acting as his career, Yang participated in Taekwondo competitions and received a scholarship from The Samsung Foundation to attend a sports university which he turned down to focus on acting lesson. He worked as a fashion model in 2011 for a short period. In 2012, Yang enrolled in Korea National University of Arts, majoring in Theater and Film.

Career 
After a month of finishing filming for Saimdang, Memoir of Colors, Yang auditioned for Dr. Romantic and got cast in the hit medical drama, which marked his acting debut. He attracted attention after playing the role of Yoo Yeon-seok's rival.

In January 2017, Yang played the roles of young Song Seung-heon and Lee Young-ae's assistant in SBS's historical drama Saimdang, Memoir of Colors. The same year, he starred in OCN's sci-fi thriller Duel, gaining praise for his portrayal of three different characters.
He then starred in the romance series Temperature of Love by Ha Myung-hee, which won him the Best New Actor award at the SBS Drama Awards, 54th Baeksang Arts Awards and the 6th APAN Star Awards. Following his acting roles, Yang experienced a rise in popularity and was labeled "monster rookie" by the press.
Yang was included in the 2017 Forbes Korea 2030 Power Leaders List placing fourth for his outstanding performance starring in four dramas in the first year of his acting career.

In 2018, Yang was cast in the romance comedy drama Still 17, playing the role of a stage designer who suffers a trauma at the age of seventeen. Yang won the Excellence Award at the SBS Drama Awards for his performance.

In 2019, Yang joined tvN reality show Coffee Friends, a project to raise awareness toward giving and aiding others, small amounts at a time. In the same year, he starred in the historical action drama My Country.

In 2020, Yang's old agency contract expired during his military service.

In 2021, Yang signed with new agency Blossom Entertainment.

Personal life

Military service 
On May 12, 2020 Yang enlisted for his mandatory military service at the 27th Division in Hwacheon, Gangwon Province. On November 1, 2021, it was reported that Yang would be discharged from mandatory military service  on November 15, 2021 without returning to the unit after his last vacation in accordance with the Ministry of Defense guidelines for preventing the spread of COVID-19.

Filmography

Film

Television series

Web series

Television show

Theater

Awards and nominations

Listicles

References

External links 
 
 
 Yang Se-jong at Daum

1992 births
Living people
People from Anyang, Gyeonggi
21st-century South Korean male actors
South Korean male television actors
South Korean male models
Korea National University of Arts alumni
Best New Actor Paeksang Arts Award (television) winners